Param (also Romanized as Pārām; also known as Paran and Yārām) is a village in Bedevostan-e Sharqi Rural District, in the Central District of Heris County, East Azerbaijan Province, Iran. At the 2006 census, its population was 833, in 172 families.

References 

Populated places in Heris County